In mathematics, Hall's conjecture is an open question, on the differences between perfect squares and perfect cubes. It asserts that a perfect square y2 and a perfect cube x3 that are not equal must lie a substantial distance apart. This question arose from consideration of the Mordell equation in the theory of integer points on elliptic curves.

The original version of Hall's conjecture, formulated by Marshall Hall, Jr. in 1970, says that there is a positive constant C such that for any integers x and y for which y2 ≠ x3,

Hall suggested that perhaps C could be taken as 1/5, which was consistent with all the data known at the time the conjecture was proposed. Danilov showed in 1982 that the exponent 1/2 on the right side (that is, the use of |x|1/2) cannot be replaced by any higher power: for no δ > 0 is there a constant C such that |y2 - x3| > C|x|1/2 + δ whenever y2 ≠ x3.

In 1965, Davenport proved an analogue of the above conjecture in the case of polynomials: 
if f(t) and g(t) are nonzero polynomials over C such that 
g(t)3 ≠ f(t)2 in C[t], then

The weak form of Hall's conjecture, stated by Stark and Trotter around 1980, replaces the square root on the right side of the inequality by any exponent less than 1/2: for any ε > 0, there is some constant c(ε) depending on ε such that for any integers x and y for which y2 ≠ x3,

The original, strong, form of the conjecture with exponent 1/2 has never been disproved, although it is no longer believed to be true and the term Hall's conjecture now generally means the version with the ε in it.  For example, in 1998, Noam Elkies found the example

4478849284284020423079182 - 58538865167812233 = -1641843,

for which compatibility with Hall's conjecture would require C to be less than .0214 ≈ 1/50, so roughly 10 times smaller than the original choice of 1/5 that Hall suggested.

The weak form of Hall's conjecture would follow from the ABC conjecture.  A generalization to other perfect powers is Pillai's conjecture.

Note that y can be computed as the
nearest integer  to x3/2.

References

 
 
Elkies, N.D. "Rational points near curves and small nonzero | 'x3 - y2'| via lattice reduction", http://arxiv.org/abs/math/0005139
Danilov, L.V., "The Diophantine equation   'x3   -  y2 '  ' =  k  ' and Hall's conjecture", 'Math.  Notes Acad. Sci. USSR' 32(1982), 617-618.
Gebel, J., Pethö, A., and Zimmer, H.G.: "On Mordell's equation", 'Compositio Math.' 110(1998), 335-367.
I. Jiménez Calvo, J. Herranz and G. Sáez Moreno, "A new algorithm to search for small nonzero |'x3 - y2'| values", 'Math. Comp.' 78 (2009), pp. 2435-2444.
S. Aanderaa, L. Kristiansen and H. K. Ruud, "Search for good examples of Hall's conjecture", 'Math. Comp.' 87 (2018), 2903-2914.

External links
 a page on the problem by Noam Elkies

Conjectures
Unsolved problems in number theory